The Unloved Woman (Spanish:La malquerida) is a 1940 Spanish drama film directed by José López Rubio. It is based on the 1913 play of the same title by Jacinto Benavente.

Synopsis 
Doña Raimunda and her daughter Acacia live in the El Soto hacienda. After becoming a widow, Raimunda contracted new marriages with Esteban, who is secretly in love with Acacia, who hates him. Esteban will try to get rid of all the men who court Acacia.

Cast
 Antonio Armet as El Rubio  
 Társila Criado as Raimunda  
 Manolo Morán as Pascual  
 Carlos Muñoz as Faustino  
 Julio Peña as Norberto  
 Luchy Soto as Acacia  
 Jesús Tordesillas as Esteban 
 Isabel de Pomés as Chica en balcón

References

Bibliography 
 Labanyi, Jo & Pavlović, Tatjana. A Companion to Spanish Cinema. John Wiley & Sons, 2012.

External links 
 

1940 films
1940 drama films
Spanish drama films
1940s Spanish-language films
Spanish black-and-white films
1940s Spanish films